Jeanne Provost (1887–1980) was a French stage and film actress. She was a member of the Comédie-Française from 1907 to 1912. In 1928 she appeared in the original cast of Marcel Pagnol's play Topaze.

Selected filmography
 After Love (1924)
 The Beautiful Adventure (1932)
 Gribouille (1937)
 Katia (1938)
 Let's Go Up the Champs-Élysées (1938)
 Monsieur Coccinelle (1938)
 President Haudecoeur (1940)
 The Ironmaster (1948)
 The Secret of Helene Marimon (1954)

References

Bibliography
 Goble, Alan. The Complete Index to Literary Sources in Film. Walter de Gruyter, 1999.

External links

1887 births
1980 deaths
French film actresses
French stage actresses
Troupe of the Comédie-Française